Albert Lemaître (c. 1864 – in or after 1906), (aka Georges Lemaître), was a French sporting motorist and early racing driver. The Comte de Dion had finished first but his steam-powered vehicle was ineligible for the main prize which was shared between the manufacturers Peugeot and Panhard.

Throughout the 1890s he competed in a range of events and races driving Peugeots, but after their withdrawal from competition in the early 1900s he was contracted to drive Mercedes.

In 1906, while he was in Paris, he murdered his wife in a domestic argument after she had filed for divorce. He then fired the third gunshot into his own head, but survived. In September 1906 he was acquitted of a crime of passion.

Family life
Albert Lemaître was born (circa 1864) in Aÿ, a village outside Épernay, where he worked in partnership with his brother as an exporter in the champagne industry. His brother's name is not established, but could be Joseph "Georges" Lemaître, born in 1868 in Aÿ as the son of the wine dealer Louis-Emmanuel Lemaître and M. Julie Fabry. This Georges Lemaître married into the Mercier champagne family and was also involved in motoring during the 1900s. 
Circa 1901 (1900), Albert married Miss Lucie Dumény after her first engagement with a Mr. Bruyant had been broken off for family reasons. His business was failing, resulting in serious domestic difficulties. After 4 years of marriage, Lucie had rekindled feelings for her ex-fiancée and in February 1906 she both filed for divorce and moved out of the marital apartment. On 7 May 1906 at the apartment on rue de Miromesnil in Paris he murdered her with two gunshots and then shot himself in the head. She was 28 years old and they had no children. Albert Lemaître was taken to the 'Hopital Beaujon'. On hearing the news of Lucie's death, Bruyant took his own life. In September 1906 Lemaître was acquitted of a crime of passion.

Car racing

1894 – Paris to Rouen

On 22 July 1894, Pierre Giffard organised what is considered to be the world's first competitive motoring event from Paris to Rouen to publicise his newspaper, Le Petit Journal.  The paper promoted it as a Competition for Horseless Carriages (Concours des Voitures sans Chevaux) that were not dangerous, easy to drive, and cheap during the journey. The 'easy to drive' clause precluded the use of a travelling mechanic or technical assistant, thereby making steam-powered vehicles ineligible for the main prize.

Lemaître completed the  qualification event on Friday 20 July, driving from Paris to Mantes-la-Jolie via Bezons, Houilles and Maisons-Laffitte.  The  main race from Paris to Rouen started from Porte Maillot and went through the Bois de Boulogne, Neuilly-sur-Seine, Courbevoie, Nanterre, Chatou, Le Pecq, Poissy, Triel-sur-Seine, Vaux-sur-Seine, and Meulan, to Mantes where he held first place with the best time 2 hours 36 minutes when they stopped for lunch from 12:00 until 13:30. Lemaître completed the final 80 kilometre section via Vernon, Eure, Gaillon, Pont-de-l'Arche, to the 'Champ de Mars' at Rouen in 4 hours 15 minutes. Lemaître and his 3 passengers took 6 hours 51 minutes 30 seconds to reach Rouen in his 3 hp Peugeot Type 7, the first petrol-powered car to finish, 13 minutes ahead of Auguste Doriot (Peugeot). The fastest vehicle, and the first home, was the steam-powered De Dion-Bouton driven by the Comte Jules-Albert de Dion, but was ineligible for the main prize because it needed a stoker, a technical assistant.

1897
On 29–31 January 1897 Lemaître finished second in the 'Marseilles-Nice-La Turbie' race driving a Peugeot.

On 24 July 1897 he finished 20th in the Paris-Dieppe Trail driving a Peugeot.

On 14 August 1897 he finished 3rd in the Paris-Trouville Trail, driving a Peugeot.

1898 – 1899

On 21 August 1898 he finished 3rd in the Bordeaux-Biarritz Trail, driving a Peugeot.

On 21 March 1899 Lemaître won the Nice-Castellane-Nice race driving a Peugeot. He was driving the latest version of rear engined, two cylinder, (140 mm bore x 190 mm stroke) Peugeot, in which he also achieved a standing start mile in 1 minute 35 seconds.

On 24 March 1899 Lemaître won the La Turbie Hill climb in 24 minutes 23 seconds in the new 17 h.p. Peugeot.

On 6 April 1899 he won the Pau-Bayonne-Pau race in a 10 hp Peugeot.

On 1 September 1899 he finished 3rd in the Paris-Ostende race driving a Peugeot.

1901 – 1902

On 25 March 1901 he drove a Mercedes in the  Nice-Salon-Nice event, but failed to finish.

On 27–29 June 1901 he finished 28th in the Paris-Berlin Trail (Subsequently, named VI Grand Prix de l'A.C.F.) driving a Mercedes.

On 7 April 1902, during Nice week, Lemaître finished second in the 'Nice – La Turbie mountain race driving a 40 hp Mercedes Simplex during its first competitive event. He was competing in the category for racing cars weighing more than 1000 kg.

Notes

References

Other sources
 (Google Books) Mercedes And Auto Racing In The Belle Epoque, 1895-1915 by Robert Dick.
 Gallica, Online Archive, Le Petit Journal Index
 Gallica, Online Archive, Le Petit Journal 7 September 1903 – Court Reports (Les Tribunaux)

External links
 Heroes of the Past – Images of Albert Lemaître and other 1894 competitors

1860s births
Year of death unknown
French racing drivers
French murderers
Sportspeople from Marne (department)